KAORI. (born 28 February 1976) is a freelance Japanese voice actress and singer from Yokohama, Kanagawa Prefecture. She was previously employed by Contemporary Music Society and Aksent.

Career
Until around 1999, KAORI. worked under the stage name  and then  at an entertainment agency, but due to a merger with the agency she belonged to, she couldn't use "Kawana Midori" anymore, so she worked under the stage name  for a brief period. The stage name KAORI., which she used since 2000, is a portmanteau of Kawana Midori.

She is also a member of the rock band Spunky Strider, in which she was a vocalist. As of 2012, she has stopped singing as a solo artist and with a band due to vocal cervical dystonia (spasmodic dysphonia). She had signs of vocal problems when she guest-starred as Haruka in Pocket Monsters: Diamond and Pearl.

Filmography
Anime
 Black Cat (2005 – 2006) - Saki (ep. 17)
 Brigadoon (2000 – 2001) - Marin Asagi
 Getbackers (2002 – 2003) - Yumiko Imai (ep. 35)
 Kaleido Star (2003 – 2004) - Milo
 The Legend of Condor Hero (2001 – 2002)
 Nana (2006 – 2007) -  Nana Komatsu
 Paradise Kiss (2005) – Store girl (ep. 6)
 Pocket Monsters: Advanced Generation (2002 – 2006) - Haruka (May)
 Pocket Monsters: Diamond and Pearl (2006 – 2010) - Haruka (May)

Anime Films
 Pokémon Ranger and the Temple of the Sea (2006) - Haruka (May)
 Pokémon: Lucario and the Mystery of Mew (2005) - Haruka (May)
 Pokémon: Destiny Deoxys (2004) - Haruka (May)
 Pokémon: Jirachi—Wish Maker (2003) - Haruka (May)

Games
 Akiba Girls (2003) - Hatoko Konoha
 Welcome to Pia Carrot - Shiho Kannazuki

Dubs
 Chaotic (2006 – 2010) - Sarah (Rebecca Soler)
 H2O: Just Add Water (2006 – 2010) - Cleo Sertori (Phoebe Tonkin)

References

External links 
 Kaori at GamePlaza -Haruka- Voice Acting DataBase 
 
 Spunky Strider blog 

1976 births
Living people
Voice actresses from Yokohama
Japanese voice actresses
Musicians from Kanagawa Prefecture
Anime musicians